The Arlington Central School District (abbreviated ACSD) is one of thirteen public school districts serving residents of Dutchess County, New York.

Organization

Coverage area
The district's territory covers substantial parts of the Towns of Beekman, La Grange, Pleasant Valley, Poughkeepsie, and Union Vale.  The district also includes small parts of the Towns of East Fishkill, Hyde Park, Pawling and Wappinger.

Enrollment
As of 2011, ACSD had 9,724 students.  In the 2010–2011 school year one elementary school, LaGrange, was shut down, its last day being June 23, 2010. Its building was converted into office space for the district. In 2014, Arlington Middle School was converted into Arthur S. May Elementary School, and the former Arthur S. May building was shut down. Both structures had served as a high school for the district in the past.

Schools

Elementary
 Beekman Elementary School 
 Vail Farm Elementary School
 Noxon Road Elementary School
 Titusville Intermediate School
 Overlook Primary School
 Arthur S. May Elementary School
 Joseph D'Aquanni West Road Intermediate School
 Traver Road Primary School

Middle

High
 Arlington High School

Other
 Dutchess County BOCES

References

Education in Dutchess County, New York
School districts in New York (state)
School districts established in 1924